Unión Deportiva Tomares is a Spanish football team based in Tomares, Seville, in the autonomous community of Andalusia. Founded in 1976, it currently plays in Tercera División RFEF – Group 10, holding home matches at Estadio Municipal San Sebastián, with a capacity of 1,000 spectators.

Season to season

4 seasons in Tercera División
1 season in Tercera rfef

References

External links
 
BDFutbol team profile
Soccerway team profile

1976 establishments in Spain
Association football clubs established in 1976
Football clubs in Andalusia